In the Twilight is a 1915 American silent short drama film directed by Tom Ricketts. The film stars Perry Banks, Charlotte Burton, Reaves Eason, David Lythgoe, Louise Lester, Vivian Rich, and Harry Van Meter.

Cast
 Harry von Meter as Samuel Drew (as Harry Van Meter)
 Vivian Rich as Mary Harris
 Jack Richardson as George Drew
 Charlotte Burton as Ellen Harris
 Perry Banks as John Drew - the Father
 Louise Lester as Mrs. Harris
 Mrs. Tom Ricketts as Doris Grant (as Josephine Ditt)
 Robert Klein as Old Grant
 B. Reeves Eason	as Clarence Handyslides (as Reaves Eason)
 Jean Durrell

External links

1915 films
1915 drama films
1915 short films
Silent American drama films
American silent short films
American black-and-white films
Films directed by Tom Ricketts
1910s American films